"Sunflower" (alternatively titled "Sunflower (Spider-Man: Into the Spider-Verse)") is a song performed by American rappers and singers Post Malone and Swae Lee, released on October 19, 2018 as a single from the soundtrack to the 2018 animated film Spider-Man: Into the Spider-Verse, and included on Post Malone's third studio album Hollywood's Bleeding (2019). It received acclaim from music critics. It became Malone's third and Lee's first song as a soloist to top the US Billboard Hot 100 songs chart. The song ranked in the top ten of the chart for 33 weeks, at the time sharing the record for the most such weeks with "Girls Like You" by Maroon 5 featuring Cardi B and "Shape of You" by Ed Sheeran (Post Malone would later break this record with his 2019 single "Circles"). "Sunflower" also reached number one in Australia, Canada, Malaysia, and New Zealand, as well as the top ten in twelve additional countries. It is certified Diamond in the US, Canada, Australia, and Mexico. In November 2022, the song set the record as the highest certified song ever by the RIAA with 17-times platinum status in the United States, meaning it accumulated 17 million equivalent song units. The song was the fourth-best-selling R&B song of the 2010s decade in the US. As of February 2023, the song is still charting on the Billboard Global 200 singles chart.

"Sunflower" was nominated for Record of the Year and Best Pop Duo/Group Performance at the 62nd Annual Grammy Awards.

The official remix features Latin singers Nicky Jam and Prince Royce.

Background
Malone confirmed his involvement with Spider-Man: Into the Spider-Verse on October 2, 2018, on The Tonight Show Starring Jimmy Fallon, in which he announced that he wrote "Sunflower", which he also performs, and played a snippet of the song. On October 15, Swae Lee revealed that he would also be on the song with Malone, and released another snippet of the song. Lee said that he was "very excited" for people to listen to the song. On October 19, 2018, "Sunflower" was released as a single. Spring Aspers, head of music and creative affairs at Sony Pictures, said that "Post and Swae have delivered a song that’s both heroic and emotional, which is exactly what a Spider-Man story needs. It’s anthemic, but also heartfelt — the perfect soundtrack for Miles to discover the Spider-Man inside himself". Swae Lee called Sunflower one of his favorites collaborations in 2018, which he stated it was "because it’s a movie placement [in Spider-Man: Into the Spider-Verse]. The main character sings “Sunflower” and uses my vocals to calm him down in a certain situation—like my music was therapeutic for him". Malone and Lee previously collaborated on the song "Spoil My Night" for Malone's 2018 album Beerbongs & Bentleys.

Music video
On October 19, 2018, a lyric video of the song was released. The video is composed of footage of the film. The lyrics are presented in the comic book style of the film, edited into the context of various scenes, such as graffiti scrawled by Miles Morales. On January 10, 2019, an official music video of the song was released, which is live action. The video contains an exclusive look at the recording session for the song showing the film logo behind Malone and Lee and a live performance. Since its release, the lyric video has received over 1.9 billion views on YouTube.

Critical reception
The song received acclaim from music critics. In Billboard, Gil Kaufman called it "a funky, dreamy ballad" after listening to a preview of the song. Israel Daramola from Spin called "Sunflower" a "glitchy, soulful record" that "will appeal to fans of the more melodic songs made by Post and Swae Lee, as they commit to full crooning throughout. It’s a short and sweet, hazy little pop song that makes sense for a kid’s film or possibly an MTV show about California teens". Patrick Doyle of Rolling Stone characterized the "hyper-catchy" song as "a diary of a rocky relationship, which walks the line between hip-hop and dream-pop".

Commercial performance

"Sunflower" debuted at number nine on the US Billboard Hot 100. After spending three weeks in the top five, it reached number one on the chart issue dated January 19, 2019, rising from number three the previous week. It became Post Malone's third and Swae Lee's first song as a soloist to top the chart. "Sunflower" is the first song from a soundtrack to reach the top of the Hot 100 since Justin Timberlake's "Can't Stop the Feeling!" from the Trolls soundtrack (2016). Additionally, "Sunflower" is the highest-charting song from a Spider-Man franchise soundtrack, passing Chad Kroeger's "Hero", featuring Josey Scott, from Music from and Inspired by Spider-Man, which reached number three in 2002. "Sunflower" also marks the first Hot 100 number one by two co-billed male leads with no other accompanying acts since George Michael and Elton John's "Don't Let the Sun Go Down on Me" (1992). Due to the large airplay lead of "Without Me" by Halsey, "Sunflower" descended to number two the following week. It continuously shuffled within the top five the following four months, going so far as to return to the runner-up spot in March and April. The song spent 33 non-consecutive weeks in the top ten of the Hot 100, tying both Ed Sheeran's "Shape of You" and Maroon 5's "Girls Like You", featuring Cardi B, for the longest top 10 run in the chart's archives. Malone's "Circles" broke the mentioned record in 2020, spending 38 consecutive weeks in the top 10. "Sunflower" topped the Canadian Hot 100 for two consecutive weeks.

According to the IFPI, "Sunflower" the was fourth most successful song of 2019, selling 13.4 million global equivalents-units. In the US, according to Nielsen Soundscan, it was the second-best performing R&B/hip-hop song of 2019, with 6.3 million equivalent units, including 668,000 digital downloads, and the fourth-best performing song on radio on that format.

Awards and nominations

Charts

Weekly charts

Year-end charts

Decade-end charts

All-time charts

Certifications

Release history

Other versions
A remix of the song, featuring new lyrics performed by Nicky Jam and Prince Royce, was released on February 22, 2019, as a bonus track in a deluxe version of the soundtrack of Spider-Man: Into the Spider-Verse.
American indie pop band Vampire Weekend covered "Sunflower" on BBC Radio 1's Live Lounge, in reference to their single of the same name from Father of the Bride (2019).

See also
 List of best-selling singles in Australia
 List of Billboard Hot 100 number-one singles of 2019
 List of Canadian Hot 100 number-one singles of 2019
 List of number-one singles of 2019 (Australia)
 List of number-one songs of 2018 (Malaysia)

References

Notes

Citations

2018 singles
2018 songs
2010s ballads
Billboard Hot 100 number-one singles
Canadian Hot 100 number-one singles
Contemporary R&B ballads
Dream pop songs
Number-one singles in Australia
Number-one singles in Malaysia
Number-one singles in New Zealand
Pop ballads
Post Malone songs
Republic Records singles
Songs written by Louis Bell
Songs written by Post Malone
Songs written by Swae Lee
Songs written for films
Songs written for animated films
Songs from Spider-Man films
Swae Lee songs
Male vocal duets
Song recordings produced by Louis Bell
Songs about flowers
Spider-Verse (franchise)